Leptodactylus stenodema is a species of frog in the family Leptodactylidae.
It is found in Brazil, Colombia, Ecuador, French Guiana, Guyana, Peru, Suriname, and possibly Bolivia.

Names
It is called huhukɨ in the Kwaza language of Rondônia, Brazil.

Habitat
Its natural habitats are subtropical or tropical moist lowland forests, rivers, freshwater marshes, intermittent freshwater marshes, and heavily degraded former forest.

It is threatened by habitat loss.

References 

stenodema
Amphibians of Brazil
Amphibians of Colombia
Amphibians of Ecuador
Amphibians of French Guiana
Amphibians of Guyana
Amphibians of Peru
Amphibians of Suriname
Amphibians described in 1875
Taxonomy articles created by Polbot